The 1918 Michigan State Normal Normalites football team was an American football team that represented Michigan State Normal College (later renamed Eastern Michigan University) as an independent during the 1918 college football season.  In their first and only season under head coach Lynn Bell, the Normalites compiled a 1–2 record and were outscored by a total of 31 to 26. Malcolm J. MacGregor was the team captain. The season was abbreviated due to the Spanish flu pandemic.

Schedule

References

Michigan State Normal
Eastern Michigan Eagles football seasons
Michigan State Normal Normalites football